The 1954–55 Scottish Cup was the 70th staging of Scotland's most prestigious football knockout competition. The Cup was won by Clyde who defeated Celtic in the replayed final. It was Clyde's second cup success, whilst Celtic lost in the final having won the last five Scottish Cup finals that they had played in. The 1955 final was the first to be televised live, being broadcast by the BBC. This was not officially announced before the match. The replayed final was not televised.

First round

Replays

Second round

Replays

Third round

Replays

Fourth round

Replays

Second Replays

Fifth round

Replays

Sixth Round

Replays

Quarter-finals

Replays

Semi-finals

Replays

Final 

Teams

Replay 

Teams

See also 
 1954–55 in Scottish football
 1954–55 Scottish League Cup

References

External links
 Video highlights from official Pathé News archive

Scottish Cup seasons
1954–55 in Scottish football
Scot